WRWW-LP (92.3 FM) is a radio station licensed to serve the community of Lowell, Michigan. The station is owned by Lowell Area Schools. It airs a variety format.

The station was assigned the call sign WIPE-LP by the Federal Communications Commission on March 14, 2014. The station changed its call sign to WRWW-LP on April 1, 2014.

References

External links
 Official Website
 

RWW-LP
RWW-LP
Variety radio stations in the United States
Radio stations established in 2014
2014 establishments in Michigan
High school radio stations in the United States
Kent County, Michigan